Lin Chun-te (born 5 July 1947) is a Taiwanese Atayal politician who served in the Legislative Yuan from 1999 to 2008.

Early life and education
Lin was born in Nantou County and is of Atayal descent. He attended National Pingtung University of Education and completed further study in education at National Taiwan Normal University. Lin then worked as a teacher.

Political career
Lin began his political career as mayor of Ren'ai, Nantou and later served on the Taiwan Provincial Consultative Council. He was first elected to the Legislative Yuan in 1998. In 2000, Lin's Kuomintang membership was revoked after he was found to have breached party regulations during the 2000 presidential election. He was reelected in 2001 as a member of the People First Party and won a third term in 2004. That year, Lin and Liao Kuo-tung led a protest against Vice President Annette Lu, after she stated that aborigines were not the first people to live in Taiwan and that the group should move to Central America. Lin ran again in the legislative elections of 2008 and finished fourth in the Highland Aborigine district. In February, Lin was indicted for vote buying.

References

1947 births
Living people
Politicians of the Republic of China on Taiwan from Nantou County
Aboriginal Members of the Legislative Yuan
Members of the 4th Legislative Yuan
Members of the 5th Legislative Yuan
Members of the 6th Legislative Yuan
Kuomintang Members of the Legislative Yuan in Taiwan
People First Party Members of the Legislative Yuan
Atayal people
National Pingtung University of Education alumni
Taiwanese schoolteachers